Allmannshofen is a municipality in the district of Augsburg, in Bavaria in Germany.

References

Augsburg (district)